Sagardighi Assembly constituency is an assembly constituency in Murshidabad district in the Indian state of West Bengal.

Overview
As per orders of the Delimitation Commission, No. 60 Sagardighi Assembly constituency covers Sagardighi community development block.

Sagadighi Assembly constituency is part of No. 9 Jangipur (Lok Sabha constituency).

Members of Legislative Assembly

^ denotes by election.

Election results

2023 by-poll
By-poll was necessitated due to the death of sitting MLA Subrata Saha of All India Trinamool Congress.

2021

2016
In the 2016 election, Subrata Saha of Trinamool Congress defeated his nearest rival, Aminul Islam of Congress.

Samsul Hoda, contesting as an Independent candidate, was a rebel Trinamool Congress candidate.

2011
In the 2011 election, Subrata Saha of Trinamool Congress defeated his nearest rival Ismail Sekh of CPI(M).

 

Aminul Islam, a rebel Congress candidate contesting as an independent, was suspended from the party, but Adhir Chowdhury, the Baharampur MP continued to extend support to him.

.# Swing calculated on Congress+Trinamool Congress vote percentages taken together in 2006.

1977–2006
In the 2006 state assembly elections, Parikshit Let of CPI(M) won the Sagardighi (SC) assembly seat defeating Rajesh Kumar Bhakat of Congress. Contests in most years were multi cornered but only winners and runners are being mentioned. Paresh Nath Das of CPI(M) defeated Rajesh Kumar Bhakat representing Trinamool Congress in 2001, Nrisinha Kumar Mandal of Congress in 1996, 1991 and 1987. Hazari Biswas of CPI(M) defeated Nrisinha Kumar Mandal of Congress in 1982 and Atul Chandra Sarkar of Congress in 1977.

1951–1972
Nrisinha Kumar Mandal of Congress won in 1972. Atul Chandra Sarkar of Congress won in 1971. Kuber Chand Haldar of Bangla Congress won in 1969. Ambika Charan Das of Congress won in 1967 and 1962. In 1957 Sagadigighi constituency was not there. Jangipur was a joint seat in 1957. It was won by Shyama Pada Bhattacharjee and Kuber Chand Haldar both of Congress. In independent India's first election in 1951 Sagardighi was a joint seat. It was won by Shyama Pada Bhattacharjee and Kuber Chand Haldar both of Congress.

References

Assembly constituencies of West Bengal
Politics of Murshidabad district